Kyril Louis-Dreyfus (born 18 December 1997) is a French businessman. He is a member of the French Louis-Dreyfus family.

Since February 2021, Louis-Dreyfus has been the Chairman of English Championship football club, Sunderland. In June 2022, he went from Chairman and minority stakeholder, to Chairman and majority stakeholder.

Early life 
Louis-Dreyfus was born in Zürich, Switzerland. He is the son of Robert Louis-Dreyfus and Margarita Louis-Dreyfus.

In 2017, Louis-Dreyfus started studying sports and business management at the Leeds Beckett University for one year and moved to attend Richmond International Academic and Soccer Academy (RIASA) for his second year. He later dropped out due to injuries.

Career 
In 2021, he acquired a "controlling" stake in the English League One football club, Sunderland A.F.C, from its previous owner, Stewart Donald. The acquisition made him the youngest chairman in English football. On 15 February 2022, it was revealed that Louis-Dreyfus was not a majority shareholder of Sunderland as his stake in the club was only 41%, with the remaining 59% of shares made up of former owner Donald, and directors Charlie Methven and Juan Sartori.

In June 2022, Louis-Dreyfus increased his shares in Sunderland Association Football Club from 41% to 51% - thus becoming majority & controlling shareholder - buying out Charlie Methvens 5%, and reducing Stewart Donalds' percentage from 34% to 19%. Juan Sartori picked up the remainder of Stewarts shares, increasing his holdings from 20% to 30%  

Louis-Dreyfus is also a 5% stakeholder in the French football club, Olympique de Marseille, and has stakes in esports' organization Ovation.

Personal life
On December 21, 2021 in St. Moritz, Switzerland, Louis-Dreyfus married his longtime girlfriend Alexandra Nowikovsky, the daughter of former Australian model Tonya Bird.

References 

French businesspeople
Louis-Dreyfus family
French football chairmen and investors
French people of Jewish descent
Living people
1997 births